Paul Kemp is the name of:

Paul S. Kemp, American fantasy author
Paul Kemp (American football) (1931–2014), former American football player, coach, and scout
Paul Kemp (actor) (1896–1953), German film actor
Paul Kemp (footballer)
Paul Kemp, a fictional character in Hunter S. Thompson's novel The Rum Diary